Armenia participated in the Junior Eurovision Song Contest 2021 in Paris, France, having internally selected Maléna as their representative with the song "". She was due to compete in the  contest with the song "Why" before the country withdrew due to the 2020 Nagorno-Karabakh war. Armenia won with 224 points; 6 points more than the runner-up Poland.

Background

Prior to the 2021 contest, Armenia had participated in the Junior Eurovision Song Contest twelve times since its first entry in 2007, with their best result being in  when they won with the song "Mama", performed by Vladimir Arzumanyan. Armenia went on to host the Junior Eurovision Song Contest 2011 in the Armenian capital Yerevan. In the 2019 contest, Karina Ignatyan represented country in Gliwice, Poland with the song "Colours of Your Dream". The song ended 9th out of 19 entries with 115 points.

Despite being included on the final list of participating countries, Armenia withdrew from the  contest in November 2020 due to the then-ongoing Nagorno-Karabakh war. It was later revealed that Maléna Fox had been internally selected to represent Armenia with the song "Why". With the Nagorno-Karabakh war ending on 10 November, Armenia's head of delegation David Tserunyan wrote on Instagram that the country would "come back stronger than ever".

Before Junior Eurovision 
On 17 November 2021, AMPTV confirmed that Maléna was internally selected to represent Armenia again in the contest. More than a month prior to the announcement, Armenian media had already reported that she was selected. It was officially revealed on 18 November 2021 that Maléna would perform "Qami Qami" at the contest, and the lyrics of the song were revealed on the junioreurovision.tv website. The song itself was released the next day.

At Junior Eurovision
After the opening ceremony, which took place on 13 December 2021, it was announced that Armenia would perform ninth on 19 December 2021, following Ireland and preceding Kazakhstan.

At the end of the contest, Armenia received a total of 224 points, winning the contest.

Voting

Detailed voting results

After Junior Eurovision 
Maléna arrived at the Zvartnots International Airport in Yerevan, Armenia, the day after the contest, where she was awaited by a crowd of press and fans.

References

Armenia
2021
Junior Eurovision Song Contest